The Temple Owls baseball team was a varsity intercollegiate athletic team of Temple University in Philadelphia, Pennsylvania, United States, until the end of the 2014 season. On December 6, 2013, Temple announced that it would cut seven sports, including baseball, at the end of the 2013–14 academic year for financial reasons.

The team was a member of the American Athletic Conference in 2014. It was previously a member of the Atlantic 10 Conference and the Big East Conference. Temple's first baseball team was fielded in 1927 and played home games at Erny Field until 2003. The team played its home games at Skip Wilson Field in Ambler from 2004 until 2013. In 2014, non-conference games were played at Skip Wilson Field and all but one conference game were played at Campbell's Field in Camden, New Jersey. Temple returned to postseason play in 2014 for the first time since 2008, playing in the Atlantic 10 Conference baseball tournament. The Owls were last coached by Ryan Wheeler.

See also
List of defunct college baseball teams

References

External links

 
Baseball teams established in 1927
Baseball teams disestablished in 2014
1927 establishments in Pennsylvania
2014 disestablishments in Pennsylvania